Rhaphium appendiculatum is a species of fly in the family Dolichopodidae. It is found in the  Palearctic .

References

External links
Images representing Rhaphium appendiculatum at BOLD

Rhaphiinae
Insects described in 1849
Asilomorph flies of Europe
Taxa named by Johan Wilhelm Zetterstedt